The Cascade Cycling Classic was the longest running elite road bicycle racing stage race in the United States (1980–2019), with 2018 being the only year the race was not held.

The race took place in the Central Oregon region and was based in Bend, Oregon. It was a regular fixture for most of North America's top cyclists and teams.
Owned and managed by the Cascade Cycling Classic Youth Foundation, former pro cyclist and two time National Road Champion Bart Bowen was both the Foundation's executive director and the Classic's race director. Bowen won the CCC in 1993.

Past winners

Elite Men 
2019 : , 
2018 : Race canceled 
2017 : , 
2016 : , 
2015 : , 
2014 : , 
2013 : , 
2012 : , Competitive Cyclist Racing Team
2011 : , Realcyclist.com Cycling Team
2010 : , UnitedHealthcare–Maxxis
2009 : , Rock Racing
2008 : , 
2007 : , Navigators Insurance Cycling Team
2006 : , Toyota–United Pro Cycling Team
2005 : , HealthNet–Maxxis
2004 : , 
2003 : , Saturn Cycling Team
2002 : , Mercury
2001 : , Mercury–Viatel
2000 : , Mercury–Viatel
1999 : , Mercury
1998 : , 
1997 : , Comptel
1996 : , Subaru–Montgomery
1995 : , Team Shaklee
1994 : , Coors
1993 : , Subaru–Montgomery
1992 : , Subaru–Montgomery
1991 : , Coors
1990 : , Alpine
1989 : , Wheaties–Schwinn
1988 : 
1987 : 
1986 : 
1985 : 
1984 : 
1983 : 
1982 : 
1981 : 
1980 :

Elite Women 
2019 : , 
2018 : Race canceled 
2017 : , 
2016 : , The Cyclery–Opus
2015 : , 
2014 : , 
2013 : , 
2012 : , Now & Novartis for MS
2011 : , Colavita/Forno d'Asolo
2010 : , Peanut Butter & Co./Twenty12
2009 : . Webcor Builders
2008 : , 
2007 : Women's race was postponed
2006 : , Team Lipton
2005 :  T-Mobile
2004 :  Webcor Builders
2003 : , Saturn
2002 : , Saturn
2001 : 
2000 : 
1999 : 
1991–98 : No women's race
1990 : 
1989 : 
1988 : 
1987 : 
1986 :

References

External links

Sports in Bend, Oregon
Cycling in Oregon
Cycle races in the United States
UCI America Tour races
Recurring sporting events established in 1980
1980 establishments in Oregon
Tourist attractions in Deschutes County, Oregon
Sports competitions in Oregon
Road bicycle races